= Atterrissage =

Single by Ronisia

from the album Ronisia
- Released: June 12, 2020
- Recorded: 2020
- Length: 3:47
- Label: Bullet
- Songwriter: Pierre Clément
- Producer: 3K BeatMakers

Ronisia singles chronology
"Atterrissage" (2020)	"Comme moi" (2021)

Music video
- "Atterrissage" on YouTube

"Atterrissage" is a song by Ronisia. It was released on June 12, 2020.

== Charts ==
Chart performance for "Atterrissage"
Chart (2020)	Peak position
Belgium (Ultratip Bubbling Under Wallonia)	41
France (SNEP)	44

=== Certifications ===
Region	Certification	Certified units/sales
France (SNEP)	Gold	100,000^{‡}
^{‡} Sales+streaming figures based on certification alone.
